was a case concerning disability discrimination and the application of equality legislation in the United Kingdom, relevant for UK labour law. It replaced the head of disability-related discrimination from the DDA 1995 with the Equality Act 2010 section 15 on discrimination arising from disability.

Facts
Courtney Malcolm, a secure council tenant in Lewisham, had schizophrenia. He sublet his house, forfeiting his right to buy under the Housing Act 1985 section 93. At the time, Malcolm had not been taking his medication. The council, unaware of Malcolm's schizophrenia, terminated his tenancy and gave him a notice to quit. A possession order was granted on the basis that a causal connection between schizophrenia and subletting had not been established.

Judgment

Court of Appeal
The Court of Appeal quashed the possession, saying it was contrary to DDA 1995 s 22(3) and that it was sufficiently in response to a disability-related reason as to satisfy s 24(1)(a). Questions raised included whether the disability had to have been on the council's mind for the discrimination to be disability-related, and whether the comparator as someone who did not suffer from schizophrenia was one who had sublet or one who had not.

House of Lords
The House of Lords held that Malcolm had to show that the council's awareness of the disability had played some part in its decision to terminate the tenancy, and that he had not done so. Because of this, Clark v Novacold had been wrongly decided; the comparator was someone who had sublet. Baroness Hale, dissenting in part, said that Parliament could have made it entirely plain through wording that the comparison to be made under DDA 1995 section 24(1)(a) was with a person who did not have the disability in question, but that Parliament had deliberately not done so and chosen a different formulation. Accordingly, the comparison in the present case ought to be made with a person who had not sublet.

Lord Bingham's judgment was as follows.

See also
Equality Act 2010
Clark v TDG Ltd (t/a Novacold Ltd)

Notes

References

United Kingdom company case law
English contract case law
House of Lords cases
2008 in case law
2008 in British law
London Borough of Lewisham
United Kingdom disability case law